Lucile Ruth Browne (March 18, 1907 – May 10, 1976) was an American film actress. She starred opposite John Wayne in the 1935 films Texas Terror and Rainbow Valley.

Personal life
The daughter of Mr. and Mrs. Harris L. Browne, she was born in Memphis, Tennessee, and moved to St. Petersburg, Florida in 1923. She began studying elocution when she was 10 years old, studied under an instructor from the University of Chicago, and attended Noyes School of Expression in Boston, Massachusetts. She was a 1925 graduate of St. Petersburg High School. 

In 1926, Browne was named Miss Florida in a beauty contest sponsored by the Tampa Times as judges selected her based on photographs of dozens of candidates. She had been named Miss St. Petersburg by a magazine the previous year. Before she made films, she worked as a model in New York and acted with a theatrical company in Chicago. 

While filming The Airmail Mystery in 1932, Browne met her future husband, actor James Flavin. They married soon after and stayed together for more than 40 years until his death April 23, 1976. Browne died 17 days later on May 10. The couple had one son, Dr. William James Flavin, a professor.

Partial filmography

The Last of the Duanes (1930) - Ruth Garrett
Soup to Nuts (1930) - Louise - Otto's Niece
Young as You Feel (1931) - Dorothy Gregson
Danger Island (1931, Serial) - Bonnie Adams
Girls About Town (1931) - Edna Howard
Battling with Buffalo Bill (1931) - Jane Mills
The Texan (1932) - Mary Lou
 Cannonball Express (1932) - Sally
The Airmail Mystery (1932) - Mary Ross
The Last of the Mohicans (1932, Serial) - Alice Munro
Parole Girl (1933) - Miss Manning (uncredited)
Fra Diavolo (1933) - Zerlina
King of the Arena (1933) - Mary Hiller
Double Harness (1933) - Valerie Colby Moore
The Crimson Paradise (1933) - Connie
Flying Down to Rio (1933) - Belinha's Friend (uncredited)
The Mystery Squadron (1933) - Dorothy Gray
Now I'll Tell (1934) - Nurse (scenes deleted)
Hide-Out (1934) - Blonde with Headache (uncredited)
The Law of the Wild (1934) - Alice Ingram
Elinor Norton (1934) - Publisher's Staff (uncredited)
The Brand of Hate (1934) - Margie Larkins
Texas Terror (1935) - Bess Mathews
Secrets of Chinatown (1935) - Zenobia
Rainbow Valley (1935) - Eleanor
On Probation (1935) - Jane Murray
Western Frontier (1935) - Mary Harper
Tumbling Tumbleweeds (1935) - Jerry
Magnificent Obsession (1935) - Nurse (uncredited)
The Crooked Trail (1936) - Helen Carter
Cheyenne Rides Again (1937) - Sally Lane
Dead End (1937) - Well-Dressed Woman (uncredited)
Sweethearts (1938) - Chorus Girl (uncredited)
Missing Daughters (1939) - Estelle (uncredited)
Ride, Tenderfoot, Ride (1940) - Marcia (uncredited)
Doctors Don't Tell (1941) - (uncredited)
A Tragedy at Midnight (1942) - Nurse (uncredited)
Once Upon a Time (1944) - Miss Flemming (uncredited)
Ladies of Washington (1944) - Taxi Passenger (uncredited)
The Thin Man Goes Home (1944) - Skating Woman (uncredited)
A Woman of Distinction (1950) - Manicurist (uncredited)
No Sad Songs for Me (1950) - Mrs. Hendrickson (uncredited)

References

External links

1907 births
1976 deaths
Actresses from Memphis, Tennessee
American film actresses
Burials at Holy Cross Cemetery, Culver City
20th-century American actresses
Western (genre) film actresses